The discography of MC Lars, an American musician and producer from Oakland, California, consists of five studio albums, seven compilation albums/mixtapes, six extended plays, two books, and twenty-seven music videos; as well as various appearances, collaborations and remixes.

Studio albums

EPs

Collaborative releases

Compilations and mixtapes

Instrumental releases

Demos

Compilation appearances

DVDs

Books

Music videos

From The Laptop EP

"iGeneration", directed by Stewart Hendler
"Signing Emo", directed by Kurt St. Thomas

From The Graduate

"Download This Song" (feat. Jaret Reddick), directed by Frank Borin
"Ahab", directed by Sean Donnelly

From The Digital Gangster LP (with YTCracker)

"Manifest Destiny", directed by Irina Slutsky
"MC Lars's Facebook Friend Count > Your Facebook Friend Count", directed by Timothy Thompson

From This Gigantic Robot Kills

"Hipster Girl", directed by Michael Licisyn
"White Kids Aren't Hyphy", directed by Odin Wadleigh & Timothy Thompson
"Guitar Hero Hero (Beating Guitar Hero Does Not Make You Slash)" (feat. Parry Gripp & Paul Gilbert), directed by Sean Donnelly
"This Gigantic Robot Kills" (feat. the MC Bat Commander & Suburban Legends), directed by Timothy Thompson
"True Player for Real" (feat. "Weird Al" Yankovic & Wheatus), directed by Richard Barham
"Twenty-Three" (feat. Amie Miriello & James Bourne), directed by Heath Balderston

From Single and Famous (with K.Flay)

"Single and Famous", directed by Timothy Thompson

From Lars Attacks!

"Lars Attacks!", directed by Timothy Thompson

From The Edgar Allan Poe EP

"Flow Like Poe", directed by Sean Donelly

From The Zombie Dinosaur LP

"Dragon Blood" (feat. Monte Pittman), directed by Brosis
"The Ballad of Hans Moleman", directed by Marianne Harris
"Triforce", directed by Odlin Wadleigh
"Never Afraid" (feat. Watsky), directed by Max Skaff
"Sublime With Rome (Is Not the Same Thing as Sublime)" (feat. Roger Lima & Suburban Legends), directed by Watt White
"If I Were a Jedi (That Would Be Hella Awesome)" (feat. Brian Mazzaferri), directed by Ben Garbe

From The Jeff Sessions

"Don't Be a Cyberbully" (feat. Wheatus & Ash Wednesday), directed by Nicole Mago

From The Dewey Decibel System (with Mega Ran)

"The Dewey Decibel System", directed by Richie Picasso
"Walden", directed by DJ 2 Thirteen
"1984" (feat. B. Dolan), directed by Kevin Parkinson
"Julius Caesar" (feat. Dan Bull), directed by Nick J. Henderson

From Blockchain Planet

"Finite Jest" (feat. Wheatus), directed by Max Skaff

References

 
Discographies of American artists